Rotheram Mill House, also known as Harmony Mills, is a historic home located at Newark, New Castle County, Delaware.  The house was built about 1740, as a -story, five-bay, gambrel roofed brick dwelling.  Before 1775, the roof was raised to a full three-bay second story with a gable roof.  It has a two-story rear kitchen wing.

It was added to the National Register of Historic Places in 1972.

References

Houses on the National Register of Historic Places in Delaware
Houses completed in 1740
Houses in Newark, Delaware
National Register of Historic Places in New Castle County, Delaware
1740 establishments in the Thirteen Colonies